Luka Elsner (born 2 August 1982) is a Slovenian professional football manager and former player. He is the manager of French Ligue 2 team Le Havre.

Club career
Growing up in France, Elsner began his career at OGC Nice, where he was part of the youth set-up and the reserve team. He later played for US Cagnes. In 2004, Elsner joined Domžale. He holds the club record for competitive appearances. Elsner also later played for Austria Kärnten and Al-Muharraq, before finishing his career at Domžale in 2012.

International career
Elsner made his debut for Slovenia on 26 May 2008 at Ullevi, Gothenburg in a friendly against Sweden.

Personal life
Elsner was born into a footballing family. His grandfather, Branko, and his father, Marko, were both footballers. His younger brother, Rok, is also a professional footballer.

Managerial statistics

Honours

Player
Domžale
Slovenian PrvaLiga: 2006–07, 2007–08
Slovenian Cup: 2010–11
Slovenian Super Cup: 2007, 2011

Al-Muharraq
Bahraini Premier League: 2010–11

Notes

References

External links

Luka Elsner at NZS 

1982 births
Living people
Footballers from Ljubljana
Slovenian footballers
Association football defenders
Slovenia under-21 international footballers
Slovenia international footballers
Slovenian expatriate footballers
Slovenian expatriate sportspeople in France
Expatriate footballers in France
OGC Nice players
Slovenian PrvaLiga players
NK Domžale players
Slovenian expatriate sportspeople in Austria
Expatriate footballers in Austria
SK Austria Kärnten players
Expatriate footballers in Bahrain
Al-Muharraq SC players
Slovenian football managers
NK Domžale managers
NK Olimpija Ljubljana (2005) managers
Slovenian expatriate football managers
Pafos FC managers
Royale Union Saint-Gilloise managers
Amiens SC managers
K.V. Kortrijk managers
Standard Liège managers
Le Havre AC managers
Expatriate football managers in Cyprus
Slovenian expatriate sportspeople in Cyprus
Expatriate football managers in Belgium
Slovenian expatriate sportspeople in Belgium
Expatriate football managers in France
Cypriot First Division managers
Belgian First Division B managers
Ligue 1 managers
Ligue 2 managers
Belgian Pro League managers
Elsner family